East Side Stories is a 2010 Hungarian drama film, which was composed of four short films, each with a different director.

Cast
 Mari Csomós
 Dezső Garas
 Ervin Nagy
 Csilla Radnay
 Judit Rezes
 Roland Rába
 Péter Telekes
 Zsolt Trill
 Anita Tóth
 Orsolya Török-Illyés
 Andi Vasluianu

References

External links
 

2010 films
2010 drama films
Hungarian drama films
2010s Hungarian-language films
Anthology films
Films directed by Szabolcs Hajdu